Busy Little Bears is a 1939 American short family film directed by John A. Haeseler. It won an Oscar at the 12th Academy Awards in 1940 for Best Short Subject (One-Reel). The film was preserved by the Academy Film Archive, in conjunction with the UCLA Film and Television Archive, in 2013.

Cast
 Frank Crumit as Narrator (voice)

References

External links

1939 films
1939 drama films
1939 short films
American drama short films
American black-and-white films
Live Action Short Film Academy Award winners
Paramount Pictures short films
1930s English-language films
1930s American films